Álvaro Pinto (4 April 1907 – 1956) was a Portuguese épée fencer. He competed at the 1948 and 1952 Summer Olympics.

References

External links
 

1907 births
1956 deaths
Portuguese male épée fencers
Olympic fencers of Portugal
Fencers at the 1948 Summer Olympics
Fencers at the 1952 Summer Olympics